Daniel Theuma (born 26 June 1971 in Malta) is a Maltese former professional footballer. He last played for Mosta as a defender.

External links
 Daniel Theuma at MaltaFootball.com
 

Living people
1971 births
Association football defenders
Maltese footballers
Malta international footballers
Floriana F.C. players
Valletta F.C. players
Msida Saint-Joseph F.C. players
Pietà Hotspurs F.C. players
Mosta F.C. players